Tupungato, one of the highest mountains in the Americas, is a massive Andean lava dome dating to Pleistocene times. Immediately to its southwest is the active Tupungatito volcano (literally, little Tupungato), which last erupted in 1987.

Tupungato Department, an important Argentine wine-producing region in Mendoza province, is named for the volcano. Recent Chilean mapping indicates it has a height of 6635m.

1947 plane crash

On 2 August 1947, the airliner Star Dust, an Avro Lancastrian carrying six passengers and five crew over the Andes range, crashed into a steep glacier high on the Argentine side of Tupungato. The plane was quickly buried in the resulting avalanche and heavy snowfall that was taking place at the time. The plane lay undetected deep beneath the snow and glacial ice for over 50 years. Its remnants finally re-emerged at the glacier terminus in 2000. Shortly thereafter, an Argentine army expedition discovered the scattered debris and wreckage, collecting some of the evidence for investigation.

See also
 Incapillo
 List of volcanoes in Argentina
 List of volcanoes in Chile
 List of mountains in the Andes
 List of Ultras of South America

Notes

References

Citations

Bibliography

External links
 Andeshandbook: complete description, history, place name and routes of Tupungato
 Pictures of Mount Tupungato
 
 "Cerro Tupungato, Argentina/Chile" on Peakbagger
 Star Dust Plane Crash Mystery
 Andes Mountains (Spanish)

Volcanoes of Mendoza Province
Volcanoes of Santiago Metropolitan Region
South Volcanic Zone
Mountains of Argentina
Mountains of Chile
Polygenetic volcanoes
Pleistocene lava domes
Pleistocene South America
Andean Volcanic Belt
Six-thousanders of the Andes
Principal Cordillera